The Texas obscenity statute is a statute prohibiting the sale of sex toys in Texas. The law was introduced in 1973, and was last updated in 2003. While the law was never formally repealed, in 2008 a U.S. District Judge released a report declaring it to be "facially unconstitutional and unenforceable."

History
In 1973, the Texas Legislature passed Section 43.21 of the Texas Penal Code, which, in part, prohibited the sale or promotion of "obscene devices." The statute defines "obscene device" as "a device including a dildo or artificial vagina, designed or marketed as useful primarily for the stimulation of human genital organs." The legislation was last updated in 2003, and Section 43.23 currently states, "A person commits an offense if, knowing its content and character, he wholesale promotes or possesses with intent to wholesale promote any obscene material or obscene device." Section (f) of the law also criminalizes the possession of six or more devices (or "multiple identical or similar" devices) as "presumed to possess them with intent to promote."

Prosecuted cases
Prosecution under the statute is rare but has occasionally occurred. In 2001, attorneys Mary and Ted Roberts used the obscenity statute in an elaborate extortion scheme against a number of men who had engaged in extramarital relations with Mary Roberts. In Burleson in 2004, Joanne Webb faced up to one year in prison for selling a vibrator to two undercover police officers posing as a married couple at a private party. She was later acquitted, and the undercover officers were issued reprimands. In 2007, a lingerie shop in Lubbock was raided, and items "deemed to be illegal by the Texas Penal Code" were confiscated. The clerk on duty at the time was arrested, but charges were later dropped.

Appeals

Reliable Consultants, Inc., who operate four retail stores in Texas that carry a stock of sexual devices, and PHE, Inc., which is also engaged in the retail distribution of sexual devices through their website and catalogs, both filed lawsuits against the legislation, claiming that the statute is unconstitutional. In an appeal from the United States District Court for the Western District of Texas, a three-judge panel of the United States Court of Appeals for the Fifth Circuit overturned the statute on February 12, 2008, by a vote of 2–1, holding that "the statute has provisions that violate the Fourteenth Amendment of the U.S. Constitution". The State of Texas filed a petition on February 22, 2008, for the Circuit Court to rehear the argument en banc.

On July 3, 2008, Texas's 13th Court of Appeals in Corpus Christi in the case of Villareal vs. State, addressed the ruling of the federal Court of Appeals. The 13th Court of Appeals ruled that until the Texas Court of Criminal Appeals rules that Section 43.23 is unconstitutional, the promotion of obscene devices remains illegal. Therefore, despite the actions of the federal courts and the Texas Attorney General described elsewhere in this article, Section 43.23 remains in effect in the twenty-county area of Texas within the jurisdiction of the 13th Court of Appeals.

On August 1, 2008, the Fifth Circuit denied Texas's request to re-hear the case en banc. The refusal created a split between federal circuits: the 5th Circuit overturned the Texas law and the 11th Circuit upheld the nearly identical Anti-Obscenity Enforcement Act in Alabama. The presence of a "circuit split" is one of the factors that increases the likelihood of the Supreme Court of the United States granting a writ of certiorari and ruling in order to clear up the disagreement between the two Courts of Appeals.

On November 4, 2008, U.S. District Judge Lee Yeakel released a two-page document dated October 29, 2008, in which he stated that the Texas Attorney General's Office notified him that they would not file a writ of certiorari with the Supreme Court. The next month, on November 13, Yeakel filed a "joint status report" that noted the parties had come to an agreement. "Texas Penal Code §§ 43.23, to the extent that it applies to 'obscene devices' as defined in Texas Penal Code § 43.21(a)(7), is declared to be facially unconstitutional and unenforceable throughout the State of Texas".

See also
Anti-Obscenity Enforcement Act (Alabama statute)

References

External links
 Austin Chronicle article
  PDF Version of Circuit Court Opinion (Rev Mar 10, 2008)

Obscenity law
Sex toys
Texas statutes
Sex offender registration
1973 legislation
1973 in Texas